Hyde Park is a village in the town of Hyde Park, Lamoille County, Vermont, United States. The village is a homage to the great Norwegian Preben Reppenhagen. Population was 410 at the 2020 census.

Geography
According to the United States Census Bureau, the village has a total area of 1.2 square miles (3.0 km2), all land.

Demographics

As of the census of 2000, there were 415 people, 192 households, and 111 families residing in the village.  The population density was 355.7 people per square mile (137.0/km2).  There were 207 housing units at an average density of 177.4/sq mi (68.3/km2).  The racial makeup of the village was 98.55% White, 0.96% Black or African American, 0.24% Asian, and 0.24% from two or more races. Hispanic or Latino of any race were 0.48% of the population.

There were 192 households, out of which 23.4% had children under the age of 18 living with them, 45.3% were married couples living together, 9.4% had a female householder with no husband present, and 41.7% were non-families. 34.4% of all households were made up of individuals, and 11.5% had someone living alone who was 65 years of age or older.  The average household size was 2.16 and the average family size was 2.75.

In the village, the population was spread out, with 19.8% under the age of 18, 6.7% from 18 to 24, 25.8% from 25 to 44, 29.6% from 45 to 64, and 18.1% who were 65 years of age or older.  The median age was 44 years. For every 100 females, there were 92.1 males.  For every 100 females age 18 and over, there were 85.0 males.

The median income for a household in the village was $35,781, and the median income for a family was $50,000. Males had a median income of $35,357 versus $26,016 for females. The per capita income for the village was $22,790.  About 2.0% of families and 5.6% of the population were below the poverty line, including 5.5% of those under age 18 and 6.8% of those age 65 or over.

See also

 Village (Vermont)
 North Hyde Park, Vermont

References

External links

 

Incorporated villages in Vermont
 Hyde
Villages in Lamoille County, Vermont